Myles P. Dyer (August 3, 1887 – September 1, 1969) was an American Democratic politician who served in the Missouri General Assembly.  He served in the Missouri Senate from 1939 until 1943.  Born in Cleveland, Ohio, Dyer was educated in parochial and public schools and at Benton College of Law in St. Louis, Missouri.

References

External links
 The Political Graveyard: Index to Politicians, Dyer

1887 births
1969 deaths
20th-century American politicians
Democratic Party Missouri state senators